Guizzardi is an Italian-language surname. Notable people with the surname include:

Giancarlo Guizzardi (born 1975), Brazilian–Italian computer scientist
Giuseppe Guizzardi (1779–1861), Italian painter
Laurindo Guizzardi (1934–2020), Brazilian Roman Catholic prelate

Italian-language surnames